Brahima Doukansy (born 21 August 1999) is a French footballer who most recently played as a midfielder for Niort.

Professional career
Doukansy made his senior debut with Niort in a 2-1 Ligue 2 loss to LB Châteauroux on 19 April 2019. He signed his first professional contract with the club in May of the same year. Doukansy left Niort at the end of the 2021–22 season having made 66 appearances for the club in all competitions.

Personal life
Born in France, Doukansy is of Malian descent.

Career statistics

References

External links

OM Profile
 

1999 births
Living people
Footballers from Paris
French footballers
French people of Malian descent
Ligue 2 players
Championnat National 2 players
Championnat National 3 players
Chamois Niortais F.C. players
Association football midfielders